The Next Plateau is an album by saxophonist Bill Barron which was recorded in 1987 and first released on the Muse label.

Reception 

In his review on Allmusic, Scott Yanow called it "a consistently stimulating advanced post-bop outing, one of Bill Barron's finest recordings"

Track listing 
All compositions by Bill Barron except where noted.
 "This One's for Monk" – 6:57
 "Yes, No, Maybe So" – 8:44
 "Ballad for My Love" – 5:00
 "Easy Does It" – 7:12
 "Travelin' on the Freeway" – 6:52
 "Row House" (Kenny Barron) – 6:52

Personnel 
Bill Barron – tenor saxophone, soprano saxophone
Kenny Barron – piano
Ray Drummond – bass
Ben Riley – drums

References 

1989 albums
Muse Records albums
Bill Barron (musician) albums